A chaser bin, also called grain cart, bank out wagon or (grain) auger wagon, is a trailer towed by a tractor with a built-in auger conveyor system, usually with a large capacity (from several hundred to over 1000 bushels; around  is average).

Design
The typical setup of a chaser bin is a cross auger, which feeds the folding unload auger, which in turn empties the contents into waiting Grain hopper trailers or mother bins.

The bins range in size, from 12T to 38T in most cases. Single axle bins usually can only handle a maximum of 20T of grain, with excess weight placing undue strain on the axle, potentially causing failure, especially on rough terrain. Bins above a capacity of 20T, tend to feature a "walking beam" chassis. This chassis design features an independent axle setup, allowing the bin to smoothly travel across ditches and divets, as well as more easily access fields where the road is higher than the field level. It also allows the load to be evenly distributed along the length of the chassis, further reducing the risk of axle failure when traveling over rough terrain, particularly with a full bin.

The design of the bins usually follows the same pattern regardless of capacity, with smooth flowing curves to allow the grain to easily unload via the cross auger. This also helps prevent the grain sticking to the walls of the bin, preventing corrosion.

The cross auger is smaller than the main unload auger, which allows the unload auger to expel the grain at a constant rate. The bins can also feature cross auger cut-offs, which allow the operator to choke the feed rate to the unload auger if it starts struggling. Unload augers can empty a full bin in a matter of minutes, with 15" augers unloading at a rate of 6T per minute, and 19" augers unloading at 10T per minute.

Usage
Chaser bins are typically used to transport harvested grain or corn over fields from a header to a road train or other hauling device which is used to cover larger distances over roads. The use of a chaser bin allows the harvester to operate continuously, eliminating the need to stop and unload.

These bins usually require tractors with large power outputs and are popular on the generally larger and more open fields of the United States and Australia, though usage in Europe is increasing.

Mother bins

Mother bins, also known as "field bins" in Queensland, offer the farmer a convenient storage location while harvesting. They offer a large storage capacity ranging from 55T to 130T. They are usually located on a paddock road at the entrance to the paddock being harvested, and allowing chaser bins to unload into them and offering truck drivers a more convenient location to fill grain into their semi-trailers. This also assists in reducing unnecessary soil compaction, by reducing the number of road trains on a given paddock.

Mother bins are not to be confused with chaser bins. Although they both hold and unload grain in the same manner, mother bins, are not designed to be used as chaser bins. They are only to be moved when empty, or if needed at a maximum of 25% full on smooth terrain only. They are designed to be a static collection point only.

External links

References 

Agricultural machinery
Grain production